The genus Lygus includes over 40 species of plant-feeding insects in the family Miridae. The term lygus bug is used for any member of genus Lygus.

Species
At one time, nearly 200 species were classified as genus Lygus, but most of those have since been reclassified into new or existing genera. Species within this genus include:

 Lygus abroniae
 Lygus aeratus
 Lygus atriflavus
 Lygus atritibialis
 Lygus borealis
 Lygus bradleyi
 Lygus ceanothi
 Lygus convexicollis
 Lygus elisus
 Lygus gemellatus
 Lygus hesperus
 Lygus humeralis
 Lygus keltoni
 Lygus lineolaris
 Lygus lupini
 Lygus maritimus
 Lygus mexicanus
 Lygus oregonae
 Lygus perplexus
 Lygus plagiatus
 Lygus potentillae
 Lygus pratensis
 Lygus punctatus
 Lygus robustus
 Lygus rolfsi
 Lygus rubroclarus
 Lygus rubrosignatus
 Lygus rufidorsus
 Lygus rugulipennis
 Lygus scudderi
 Lygus shulli
 Lygus solidaginis
 Lygus striatus
 Lygus unctuosus
 Lygus wagneri
 Lygus vanduzeei
 Lygus varius

The tarnished plant bug (Lygus lineolaris) feeds on over half of all commercially grown crop plants, but favors cotton, alfalfa, beans, stone fruits, and conifer seedlings. This bug can be found across North America, from northern Canada to southern Mexico.
The western tarnished plant bug (Lygus hesperus) is a very serious pest of cotton, strawberries, and seed crops such as alfalfa. In the state of California alone the bug causes US$30 million in damage to cotton plants each year, and at least US$40 million in losses to the state's strawberry industry.
The European tarnished plant bug (Lygus rugulipennis) is distributed throughout Europe, where it will feed on over 400 types of crop plant from peach trees to wheat to lettuce.

Description
These insects appear as small oval creatures. Adult lygus are approximately 3 mm wide and 6 mm long, colored anything in a range from pale green to reddish brown or black. The bugs can be solid shaded or mottled, and have a distinctive triangle or V-shape on their backs. Adults are capable of flight, and will often thus escape when approached. Nymphs are wingless, and being light green in color, are often mistaken for aphids. However, lygus nymphs have harder exoskeletons, are typically more active, gain spots as they age, and lack aphid cornicles.[7]

Biology
Lygus bugs are known for their destructive feeding habits - they puncture plant tissues with their piercing mouthparts, and feed by sucking sap. Both the physical injury and the plant's own reaction to the bugs' saliva cause damage to the plant. The females insert their eggs directly into the plant tissues using piercing ovipositors, and the newly emerged nymphs are voracious consumers of plant tissue juices. Signs that a plant has been attacked by lygus bugs include discoloration, deformation of shoots and stems, curling of leaves, and lesions on the plant tissues.

Economic importance
The more well-known lygus bugs are those that have agricultural impacts. Some lygus bugs are very serious agricultural pests.

Some methods of biological pest control have proved useful against lygus bugs. For example, wasps of the genus Peristenus are parasitoids of lygus bugs; an adult wasp will inject an egg into a lygus nymph, and once the egg hatches the wasp's larva will consume the nymph from the inside out.

Gallery

References

 
Miridae genera
Agricultural pest insects
Taxa named by Carl Wilhelm Hahn